Ernst Krankemann (19 December 1895 – 28 July 1941) was an infamous Kapo in Auschwitz concentration camp.

A German criminal, he was transferred into Auschwitz on 29 August 1940. Although generally disliked amongst the SS, Krankemann had powerful supporters such as Karl Fritzsch, the camp's Lagerführer (camp leader and deputy of camp commandant Rudolf Hoess).

As a Kapo, Krankemann held great power over other inmates of Auschwitz, including the authority to murder. One infamous incident involved Krankemann ordering other inmates to pull a very heavy roller over a collapsed inmate, killing him.

On 28 July 1941, as part of the newly extended adult euthanasia Action 14f13, Krankemann was chosen along with around 500 other inmates to be taken by train to a converted mental hospital at Sonnenstein near Dresden. These were the first Auschwitz inmates to be gassed, although they were not gassed at Auschwitz itself.

References 

1895 births
1941 deaths
German people who died in Auschwitz concentration camp
German murderers
German civilians killed in World War II
People killed by gas chamber by Nazi Germany
Kapos (concentration camp)